Thibault Vlietinck (born 19 August 1997) is a Belgian professional footballer who plays for Belgian First Division A side OH Leuven.

Club career 
Vlietinck is a youth exponent from Club Brugge. He made his senior debut on 14 October 2016 in the Belgian Pro League against Charleroi. He replaced Jelle Vossen after 89 minutes.

On 12 August 2022, Vlietinck moved to OH Leuven on a permanent basis after playing at the club on loan for two seasons, and signed a four-year contract.

References

External links

1997 births
Living people
Belgian footballers
Belgium youth international footballers
Association football midfielders
Club Brugge KV players
Oud-Heverlee Leuven players
Belgian Pro League players